The  is a Kofun period burial mound located in the Yanase neighborhood the city of Annaka, Gunma Prefecture in the northern Kantō region of Japan. It was designated a National Historic Site of Japan in 2012. It is the only keyhole-shaped kofun, found along the Usui River and one of the largest in Gunma Prefecture.

Overview
The Yanase Futagozuka Kofun is located on a river terrace on the left bank of Usui River in western Gunma Prefecture. It was excavated in 1879, at which time the burial chamber was opened and various grave goods were recovered. It was re-surveyed in 1957 and re-excavated in 1995.

The tumulus is constructed with two tiers and is orientated towards the west. The surface was covered in fukiishi and rows of cylindrical haniwa were found on top and on the terrace between the two tiers. Other types of haniwa shaped as human figures, horses, etc. were also found. The tumulus was surrounded by a double moat. The burial chamber was stone-lined passage grave, with the walls made of river stones painted in vermillion, and with the ceiling made from a tuff megalith. From the construction and type of grave goods it is estimated that this tumulus dates from the beginning of the 6th century AD in the late Kofun period. The grave goods included fragments of iron swords and weapons, armor, horse fittings, and a large number of beads, magatama, and other items of jewelry, as well as Sue ware pottery. Some 1240 artifacts were designated as an important cultural property of Annaka City in 2012.

The tumulus is now open to the public as part of a historic park with a  small museum, the ..

Overall length 80 meters
Posterior circular portion 50 meters diameter x 8 meters high, 2 tiers
Anterior rectangular portion 60 meters wide x 7 meters high, 2 tiers

See also
List of Historic Sites of Japan (Gunma)

References

External links
Annaka City official guide 
Gunma Prefecture official guide 

Kofun
History of Gunma Prefecture
Annaka, Gunma
Archaeological sites in Japan
Historic Sites of Japan